The Watertown Bridge is a five-lane traffic bridge over the Charles River, carrying Rt. 16 and Galen Street.  It connects Watertown Square on the north side and Watertown Yard on the south side of Watertown, Massachusetts.  Pedestrian walkways line each side.

History 
Beginning as a ford, this river crossing has been spanned by bridges since 1641.  The current span dates from 1907.  Previous bridges date from 1647, 1667, and 1719.

The 1994 film The River Wild opens with Meryl Streep rowing downstream under the Watertown Bridge.

See also 
List of crossings of the Charles River

References 

 Information engraved on the bridge
 The River Wild
 History of the Town of Weston, Massachusetts, 1630-1890 by Daniel S. Lamson
 Historic Bridges of the U.S.: Watertown Bridge

Buildings and structures in Watertown, Massachusetts
Bridges completed in 1907
Bridges in Middlesex County, Massachusetts
Road bridges in Massachusetts
Bridges over the Charles River
1641 establishments in the Thirteen Colonies